Box End (or Kempston Box End) is a small village located in the Borough of Bedford in Bedfordshire, England. It is in the civil parish of Kempston Rural.

The settlement was historically one of the hamlets (or "Ends") of Kempston. Today, Box End forms part of the Kempston Rural civil parish.

One of the village's historic structures is known as "Box End House."  It was home to Captain Thomas Carter who sailed to the American colonies in the mid 17th Century. Carter landed on the coast of what is now the state of Georgia and settled around what is now known as the city of Americus. One of Carter's direct descendants is former U.S. President Jimmy Carter.

There are now thousands of Carter descendants living across the U.S. continent. One of Captain Carter's direct descendants is American radio personality Dave Mitchell. Box End also has a wakeboard cable .

External links

Villages in Bedfordshire
Borough of Bedford